Diflucortolone valerate (also Nerisone cream/oily cream/ointment, Neriderm ointment, Japanese  is a corticosteroid rated Class 2 "potent" (100-150 times) in the New Zealand topical steroid system. It is a white to creamy white crystalline powder. It is practically insoluble in water, freely soluble in dichloromethane and in dioxan, sparingly soluble in ether and slightly soluble in methyl alcohol. Chemically, it is a corticosteroid esterified with valeric acid.  It is commonly used topically in dermatology.  The brand name is Nerisone; its creams come in potencies of 0.1% and 0.3%.

See also
 Diflucortolone

References

Corticosteroid esters
Corticosteroids
Valerate esters

ja:ジフルコルトロン